Justin V. Parish (born August 27, 1980) is an American politician who served for one term in the Alaska House of Representatives.   His family includes Tlingit people. In 2017, "Representative Justin Parish, a first-time legislator, introduced himself in Tlingit and acknowledged his own Native heritage. His paternal grandmother is a member of the Dog Salmon clan."

Career 
Parish was elected to the Alaska House in 2017, defeating Republican incumbent Cathy Muñoz in 2016. After opting not to seek re-election, he endorsed the candidacy of his chief of staff, Juneau Borough Assemblyman Rob Edwardson, to succeed him. The 2018 general election was won by another Democrat, Andi Story. Parish represented Alaska's thirty-fourth district, which encompasses parts of Juneau, Alaska, including the Mendenhall Valley, Auke Bay, Out the road, and Airport areas.

References

External links
 http://www.akleg.gov/basis/Member/Detail/30?code=pai
 https://www.ktoo.org/2018/04/24/juneaus-rep-justin-parish-wont-seek-re-election/
 https://www.ktoo.org/2017/02/02/juneau-delegation-meets-tlingit-haida-tribes/

1980 births
21st-century Native Americans
Alaska Native people
Living people
Democratic Party members of the Alaska House of Representatives
Native American state legislators in Alaska
Politicians from Juneau, Alaska
Tlingit people